Gadasarai is a village in Dindori district in the state of Madhya Pradesh, India.

Geography
It has an average elevation of 950 metres (2,099 feet).

Transportation 

Gadasari can be reached by road from Dindori and does not have any airport or railway stations nearby.

See Also 

 Dindori

References

Villages in Dindori district